Niono Cercle is an administrative subdivision of the Ségou Region of Mali. The administrative center (chef-lieu) is the town of Niono.

The cercle is divided into 12 communes:
Diabaly
Dogofry
Kala Siguida
Mariko
Nampalari
Niono
Pogo
Siribala
Sirifila-Boundy
Sokolo
Toridaga-Ko
Yeredon Saniona

References

Cercles of Mali
Ségou Region